Ioannis Talianos (born 1901, date of death unknown) was a Greek sprinter. He competed in the men's 4 × 100 metres relay at the 1924 Summer Olympics.

References

External links
 

1901 births
Year of death missing
Athletes (track and field) at the 1924 Summer Olympics
Greek male sprinters
Greek male hurdlers
Olympic athletes of Greece
Place of birth missing
20th-century Greek people